2003 Saudi-Egyptian Super Cup (President Mubarak's League Winners' Super Cup), was the second tie of 2003 Saudi-Egyptian Super Cup, the match took place on 24 July 2003, at Cairo Stadium in Cairo, Egypt, between Zamalek the 2002–03 Egyptian Premier League winner, and Ittihad the 2002–03 Saudi Premier League winner.

Zamalek won the trophy after beating Ittihad 2–1 in the penalty shoot-out, with the game ending 0–0.

Match details

External links 
 http://www.angelfire.com/ak/EgyptianSports/ZamalekARclubs.html#Saudi
 :ar:كأس السوبر المصري السعودى
 https://archive.today/20131122173126/http://yyy.ahram.org.eg/archive/2003/7/25/SPOR26.HTM
 https://web.archive.org/web/20131115115313/http://saihat.net/vb/archive/index.php/t-48686.html

M
S
S
2003–04 in Egyptian football
Saudi-Egyptian Super Cup